Opades costipennis is a species of beetle in the family Cerambycidae, the only species in the genus Opades.

References

Eburiini